AD Vos Esperança or Associação Desportiva Vos Esperança are a football team from Dili playing in the Super Liga Timorense.

External links
AD Esperança at national-football-teams.com

Football clubs in East Timor
Football
Sport in Dili